Isaak Nicolai or Isaac Claesz van Swanenburg (1537 – 1614 in Leiden) was a Dutch Renaissance painter and glazier active in Leiden and Gouda. He was a city council member from 1576 and became mayor of Leiden five times.

Biography
According to Houbraken, Swanenburg was a very good painter, whose paintings hung in various council buildings of Leiden. Houbraken was surprised that Swanenburg was never mentioned in Karel van Mander's Schilder-boeck. Houbraken was however mistaken, because Swanenburg is mentioned as one of more than 20 disciples of Frans Floris in Van Mander's long list of pupils. According to the Netherlands Institute for Art History, Swanenburg was in Antwerp studying with Floris for 6–8 years in his youth, and settled in Leiden after his training in 1565. He briefly fled to Hamburg for a year during the Siege of Leiden, but had returned by 1574. He kept a large and respected workshop in Leiden, for oil- and glass painting. His pupils were Jan van Goyen, Coenraet van Schilperoort, Otto van Veen, and his three sons. He was buried in the Pieterskerk, Leiden.

Paintings
 
Swanenburg created the cartoons for the stained glass windows no. 25 and 26 from Leiden to the Janskerk in Gouda. The reference in Van Mander is to Isaack Claessen Cloeck, which is revealing considering that the registers of Gouda show Swanenburg was paid a third of the sum that went to the Leiden glasspainter Cornelis Cornelisz Clock. This Clock was a probable relative.

Legacy
Swanenburg's paintings of various notable burgers of Leiden have survived, as well as a series of monumental historical allegories on the wool trade, an important source of income for the city during his time as councilman.

Swanenburg's oldest son, Jacob Isaacsz Swanenburg, became a painter and a master of the young Rembrandt. Claes Isaacsz Swanenburg also became a painter and lived and worked in the Hague, where his art was appreciated. The youngest son, Willem Isaacsz Swanenburg, became an engraver.

Literature
 Ute Elisabeth Flieger: Bürgerstolz und Wollgewerbe. Der Bilderzyklus des Isaac Claesz. van Swanenburg (1537-1614) in der Lakenhal von Leiden. Magisterarbeit Universität Münster. Münster, Waxmann, 2010. 
 Rudolf E.O. Ekkart: Isaac Claesz. van Swanenburg, 1537-1614. Leids schilder en burgemeester. Zwolle, Waanders, 1998.

References

 site of the St. Janskerk with virtual tour

1537 births
1614 deaths
Burials at Pieterskerk, Leiden
Dutch Golden Age painters
Dutch male painters
Mayors in South Holland
People from Leiden
Artists from Leiden